Ballagarey (  – 'sourland, wet area farm') is located between the third and fourth milemarkers used for recognition of the Snaefell Mountain Course road-racing circuit on the primary A1 Douglas to Peel road, in the parish of Marown in the Isle of Man.

Description
As part of a wayside residential ribbon development, Ballagarey  is situated on the eastern edge of Glen Vine and Crosby villages on the primary A1 road in the Douglas-to-Peel central valley.

Motor-Sport heritage
The Ballagarey Corner (or Elm Bank) section of the A1 Douglas to Peel road  was part of the short Highland Course (40.38 miles) from 1906 and the also the 37.50 Mile Four Inch Course used for car racing including the  RAC Tourist Trophy car races held between 1905 and 1922. 

In 1911, the Four Inch Course  was first used by the Auto-Cycling Union for the Isle of Man TT motorcycle races.  This included the Ballagarey Corner and Crosby village sections and the course later became known as the 37.73 mile Isle of Man TT Mountain Course which has been used since 1911 for the Isle of Man TT Races  and from 1923 for the Manx Grand Prix races.

It was the setting for a spectacular crash in 2010 when Guy Martin's race bike crashed at high speed, with a full tank of fuel after a pit stop just minutes earlier, exploding into a fireball a day after a fatal racing accident involving New Zealand rider Paul Dobbs at the same location. Keith Amor, closely following Martin, had to ride through the immediate aftermath, having been alerted by seeing smoke and trackside marshals running. Martin escaped serious injury, and after being helicopter-airlifted, recovered in hospital from bruising to both lungs and minor fractures to his upper spine.

Due to the high-speeds attained through Ballagarey during motorcycle competition, it has become known as Ballascarey.

Media
Ballagarey Corner featured in the Isle of Man Film CinemaNX production TT3D: Closer to the Edge after an accident to road racer Guy Martin during lap 3 of the 2010 Senior TT races caused a number of protective hay bales to be set alight by a petrol fireball.

Sources

External links

Ballagarey
Corners of the Isle of Man TT